In the Yoruba religion, Agemo is a chameleon that is the servant of the god Olorun, head of the Yoruba pantheon of deities (known as Orishas). Agemo carries messages between the gods.

Mythology
In one myth, Agemo helped his master Olorun win in a competition against Olokun, goddess of the sea. Olokun was skilled at weaving and dyeing cloth, which made her think that she was superior to all of the other Orishas, including Olorun. She challenged Olorun to a cloth-making contest to determine who was truly superior. Olorun told Agemo to ask Olokun to show him her best cloth, and if he was impressed, he would accept the challenge. Agemo, being a chameleon, was able to replicate the patterns of every piece of cloth that Olokun produced. Olokun thought that if Olorun's messenger could so easily replicate her work, she would be no match for Olorun himself, and admitted defeat.

Cult and worship
Agemo is the main deity of the Ijebu people. Agemo's cult spread primarily through the conversion of infertile women, many of whom went to the deity to cure their infertility. When they were cured, they dedicated themselves and their children to worshipping Agemo.

In the past, human sacrifice was offered to Agemo, with the human victim being allowed to rot in the grove shrine of the deity. Later on, a change was made where a human and a cow were sacrificed on alternate years. The year on which a human was sacrificed was called Ako Odun, and the year on which the cow was sacrificed was known as Abo Odun. When human sacrifice was abolished, Ako Odun became a year for sacrificing a bull, and Abo Odun became a year for sacrificing a female cow. Unlike the human sacrifices, which were left to rot, the sacrifices of bulls and cows are eaten by the people.

The Agemo festival is a masked festival traditionally held in many Yoruba cities but more popularly linked with the Ijebu people of Ogun State. The festival and accompanying rituals are celebrated to honor Agemo, who is believed to be a protector of children and who safeguards the future of Ijebu people through his blessing.

References

Yoruba gods
Messenger gods
Legendary reptiles